Single-family may refer to:

 Single-family detached home, a free-standing residential building
 Single-family loan, a rural housing loan
 Single-family office, a private company that manages investments and trusts for a single wealthy family